East London Waste Authority is a London waste disposal authority with responsibility for disposal of waste in the East London boroughs of London boroughs of Newham, Barking and Dagenham, Havering and Redbridge

History

The waste authority was established on 1 April 1986 as a joint arrangement under part II of the Local Government Act 1985. It replaced the Greater London Council in part of northeast London. The establishment of joint committees for this purpose was voluntary. The boroughs could have become individual waste disposal authorities. Each was already, and continued to be, responsible for waste collection.

Members

Role
The function of the authority is to transport and dispose of waste collected in each of the four East London boroughs it is responsible for. In 1995 the Authority served a population of over one million, and treated and disposed of up to 400,000 tonnes per annum of waste.

References

External links
Waste Management, Removal of Rubbish & Interim Storage

Waste organizations
Local government in London
Waste management in London
Waste disposal authorities
1986 establishments in the United Kingdom
Organizations established in 1986
Greater London Council replacement organisations
Levying bodies in England